Sid Meier's Gettysburg! is a 1997 real-time wargame developed by Firaxis Games and published by Electronic Arts. It was designed by Sid Meier, and followed by Sid Meier's Antietam! in 1999.

Gameplay
The game allows the player to control either the Confederate or Union troops during the Battle of Gettysburg in the American Civil War. It can be played as single scenarios, or as a campaign of linked scenarios, either recounting the original history or exploring alternative possibilities.

Online play
There was a large online following when the game was being hosted on Mplayer (a multi-player game network bought by GameSpy industries). After moving to GameSpy, the game dwindled in popularity for online players. At the pinnacle of online play, there were many groups of players. A competitive ladder (league) was also a fixture of this time, where the hall of fame can still be viewed. "Case's Ladder" Online play is now, for the most part, impossible due to the shutdown of GameSpy's servers.

As of 2017, the game is still playable online with GameRanger.

Development
The engine was also used for the Napoleonic game Waterloo: Napoleon's Last Battle (as was a modified version for Austerlitz: Napoleon's Greatest Victory), both by BreakAway Games.

Reception

Gettysburg! was a commercial success, with more than 200,000 copies sold by August 1999. At the time, Jeff Briggs of Firaxis commented that the game "did extremely well for us". From critics, it received "universal acclaim" according to the review aggregation website Metacritic.

Gettysburg! was a finalist for the Academy of Interactive Arts & Sciences' 1997 "Strategy Game of the Year" award, which ultimately went to StarCraft and Age of Empires (tie). Similarly, the Computer Game Developers Conference nominated Gettysburg! for its "Best Strategy/Wargame" Spotlight Award, but gave the prize to Myth: The Fallen Lords. However, it was named the best computer wargame of 1997 by Computer Gaming World, Computer Games Strategy Plus and GameSpot. The editors of Computer Gaming World called it "the return to form of arguably the best designer ever", and wrote that "this is one game that really will play until Johnny comes marching home."

Next Generation stated that "Gettysburg is an excellent first offering from Firaxis. It not only overshadows previous historical sims, but it also beats most of the realtime strategy games available today." They cited its simple, intuitive control interface as key to making it stand out from the often overly complex games in its genre, stating that it allows players to more easily focus on the finer points of strategy and planning. J.C. Herz, writing for The New York Times, pondered the assumptions underlying the game's simulation of the historical battle. He felt that the game could be a useful tool to teach history but worried that the interactive medium could obscure historical facts behind its systems.

In 1998, Gettysburg won the Origins Award for Best Strategy Computer Game of 1997.

Legacy
Gettysburg had a large modification ("mod") community. Players can customize uniforms, maps, sounds, and units. This aspect of tweaking the game proved vital to Civil War aficionados looking for historically accurate models. This ultimately led to the creation of other famous battles such as the Battle of Fredericksburg, the First Battle of Bull Run, the Peninsula Campaign, and more.

References

External links
 

1997 video games
American Civil War video games
Computer wargames
Firaxis Games games
Origins Award winners
Real-time tactics video games
Gettysburg!
Video games developed in the United States
Video games set in the United States
Video games set in Pennsylvania
Windows games
Windows-only games
Battle of Gettysburg
Multiplayer and single-player video games